Scopula albiflava is a moth of the family Geometridae. It was described by Warren by 1896. It is found in India (Assam).

References

Moths described in 1896
albiflava
Moths of Asia
Taxa named by William Warren (entomologist)